Francis S. Lorenz (September 4, 1914 – June 26, 2008) was an American jurist and politician.

Born in Chicago, Illinois, Lorenz received his bachelor's degree in law from DePaul University College of Law and was admitted to the Illinois bar. He served as an assistant corporation counsel for the city of Chicago in the 1940s. He was elected Clerk of the Superior Court of Cook County in 1956 and Cook County Treasurer in 1958 and was a Democrat. In 1961, Illinois Governor Otto Kerner, Jr. appointed Lorenz Illinois Treasurer to fill a vacancy, when Joseph D. Lohman resigned. Then, in 1962, Kerner appointed Lorenz director of the Illinois Department of Public Works and Buildings. From 1970 to 1992, Lorenz served as judge of the Illinois Appellate Court. He died in Barrington, Illinois of pneumonia at age 93.

Notes

1914 births
2008 deaths
Politicians from Chicago
DePaul University College of Law alumni
Illinois Democrats
County clerks in Illinois
Judges of the Illinois Appellate Court
State treasurers of Illinois
State cabinet secretaries of Illinois
20th-century American judges